Pennsylvania Water & Power was an American company. It was the first power plant in the world to combine a hydroelectric generator and a coal power generator on the same site. John Abbet Walls was president.

See also

References

American companies established in 1920
Defunct companies based in Pennsylvania
Electric power companies of the United States
Companies with year of disestablishment missing
1920 establishments in Pennsylvania